Bath by-election may refer to:

 May 1873 Bath by-election
 June 1873 Bath by-election
 October 1873 Bath by-election
 1880 Bath by-election
 1918 Bath by-election
 1929 Bath by-election